Jorge Oscar López (born 22 February 1960) is an Argentine boxer. He competed in the men's light middleweight event at the 1988 Summer Olympics.

References

1960 births
Living people
Argentine male boxers
Olympic boxers of Argentina
Boxers at the 1988 Summer Olympics
Place of birth missing (living people)
Light-middleweight boxers